Ayer Kuning (Jawi: ايير كونيڠ) is a mukim and new village in Tampin District, Negeri Sembilan, Malaysia.

References

Mukims of Negeri Sembilan
Tampin District